The 2019 FIM MotoGP World Championship was the premier class of the 71st F.I.M. Road Racing World Championship season.

After fifteen rounds of the championship, Marc Márquez successfully defended his Rider's Championship in Thailand taking his sixth premier class title and fourth in a row, having already won nine races. He ultimately won 12 races, breaking the single-season points and podium records with 420 points and 18 podium finishes from 19 races. Andrea Dovizioso once again finished second for Ducati for the third consecutive season with two wins, and Maverick Viñales with Yamaha sealed third with two wins. Álex Rins and Danilo Petrucci were the other race winners, both riders achieving their first-ever race wins during the season. In spite of Márquez's sizeable championship margin, seven races, namely Qatar, Italy, Austria, Britain, San Marino, Thailand and Australia were decided with last-lap passes, the season having seen plenty of close racing.

Teams and riders

All the bikes used series-specified Michelin tyres.

Team changes
Tech3 switched to KTM machines, ending their twenty-year satellite relationship with Yamaha. As a result of this link-up, Tech3 dropped long-time title sponsor Monster Energy, replaced by rival Austrian energy drink Red Bull.
Ángel Nieto Team joined forces with SIC Racing Team to field two Yamaha YZR-M1 satellite bikes, replacing Tech3 as Yamaha's satellite team. 
EG 0,0 Marc VDS shut down their MotoGP class operation to make room for MotoE bikes.

Rider changes
Francesco Bagnaia was promoted to the MotoGP class, joining Pramac Racing. He replaced Danilo Petrucci, who moved to Ducati Corse, taking over the seat vacated by Jorge Lorenzo.
Andrea Iannone left Suzuki at the end of the 2018 championship after two seasons. He joined Aprilia where he replaced Scott Redding, who moved to the British Superbike Championship. 2017 Moto3 champion Joan Mir took over the seat vacated by Iannone at Suzuki.
Miguel Oliveira was promoted to the MotoGP class, joining Tech3 and partner with Malaysian rider Hafizh Syahrin. He will become the first rider to come through the Red Bull KTM system to the premier class, having competed in the Rookies Cup, Moto3 and Moto2 with KTM bikes.
Jorge Lorenzo left Ducati's factory team after two seasons to join Repsol Honda. He replaced Dani Pedrosa, who retired at the conclusion of the 2018 season to take a testing role with KTM.
Johann Zarco left Tech3 to join Red Bull KTM Factory Racing. He replaced Bradley Smith who switched to the MotoE World Cup.
Franco Morbidelli joined Petronas Yamaha Sepang Racing Team. He was partnered by Fabio Quartararo.
Thomas Lüthi stepped back to Moto2 with the Dynavolt Intact GP team.
Having competed in MotoGP since 2010, Álvaro Bautista switched to the Superbike World Championship.
Karel Abraham joined Avintia Racing after two seasons with Aspar Racing Team/Ángel Nieto Team.
Xavier Simeon switched to the MotoE World Cup while remaining with Avintia Racing.
Maverick Viñales changed his race number to 12, replacing the number 25 he had previously used for the majority of his Grand Prix racing career.

Mid-season changes
Because of two fractured vertebrae sustained in Assen, Jorge Lorenzo was absent from the German, Czech and Austrian rounds. He was replaced by Stefan Bradl.
Because of a pulmonary contusion, Joan Mir missed the Austrian and British rounds. He was replaced by Sylvain Guintoli at Silverstone.
Mika Kallio replaced Johann Zarco following his early release by KTM, starting from the Aragon Grand Prix.
Johann Zarco replaced Takaaki Nakagami in the Australian, Malaysian and Valencian rounds, following the decision of the Japanese rider to operate on his right shoulder following a trauma sustained during the championship.
Moto2 rider Iker Lecuona made his MotoGP debut prematurely at the final race of the season, replacing Miguel Oliveira  at Tech3, who was sidelined following an injury sustained at the Australian Grand Prix. Lecuona was previously signed to race for Tech3 in MotoGP beginning in 2020.

Rule changes

The season saw the introduction of a new penalty called the "Long Lap" penalty for infractions such as exceeding track limits or engaging in reckless riding. At each circuit, a route is to be defined and marked at a safe point around the circuit (usually an asphalt run-off area outside of a turn). The penalised rider must ride through the defined area within 3 laps of being notified, thereby suffering a penalty equivalent typically to 2 or more seconds on that lap.

Calendar
The following Grands Prix took place during the season:

 ‡ = Night race

Results and standings

Grands Prix

Riders' standings
Scoring system
Points were awarded to the top fifteen finishers. A rider had to finish the race to earn points.

Constructors' standings
Scoring system
Points were awarded to the top fifteen finishers. A rider had to finish the race to earn points.

 Each constructor got the same number of points as their best placed rider in each race.

Teams' standings
The teams' standings were based on results obtained by regular and substitute riders; wild-card entries were ineligible.

References

 
MotoGP
Grand Prix motorcycle racing seasons